Beighton railway station is a former railway station near the village of Beighton on the border between  Derbyshire and South Yorkshire, England.

Three stations
Beighton station existed on three sites at different times:

 the first station, believed to have been little more than a halt, was opened by the North Midland Railway when it built its  to  line, which is now predominantly a freight route. This original station was opened when the line opened in June 1840, it was not near to or convenient for the village of Beighton and closed in January 1843.
They built Beighton's second station at a site on their line only, close to, but not on, the junction. The MS&LR hurried to open this branch to enable a revenue earning service to Eckington to commence and give connections to North Midland trains. This second station closed temporarily from 1852 to 1854 then continued in use until 1892.
 in 1892 the MS&LR opened its "Derbyshire Lines" route near Beighton. This would eventually become part of the Great Central Main Line.

At the time this station was within Derbyshire but following changes in boundaries the site is now within the City of Sheffield, South Yorkshire, England.

Context
All three stations were in the flood plain of the River Rother, which repeatedly led to problems. In 1950 these plus the generally poor state of the station building led British Railways to raise platform levels and undertake other remedial works.

Beighton station closed for the third and final time on 1 November 1954. It has since been demolished.

In 1897 the Lancashire, Derbyshire and East Coast Railway opened in a branch from Langwith Junction. The original hope had been to join the MS&LR line into Sheffield Victoria but it was rebuffed, so a goods yard and connection to the ex-North Midland line at Beighton was built instead, though this did not touch Beighton station. The LD&ECR obtained running rights along the Midland line to Treeton Junction and entered Sheffield via the Sheffield District Railway when it opened in 1900.

In March 2021, the 120-year-old Beighton Station Junction signal cabin, the last remaining relic of the station, was demolished, with control of the lines passing to the York Rail Operating Centre.

References

Notes

Sources

External links
 Beighton Station signalbox images: via flickr
 Beighton Station history: via disused-stations
 Beighton Station railway environs: via signalboxes
 Beighton Station: via picturesheffield

 

Disused railway stations in Sheffield
Railway stations in Great Britain opened in 1893
Railway stations in Great Britain closed in 1954
Former Great Central Railway stations